Detroit Panthers may refer to:

 Detroit Panthers (NFL), defunct American football team that played in the National Football League.
 Detroit Panthers (PBL), defunct basketball team that played in the Premier Basketball League.